Pig fallopian tubes (Cantonese: Sang Cheong) is a traditional, although uncommon,  Singaporean stir fry dish.

Preparation and description
The dish is prepared by stir-frying fallopian tubes (sometimes the uterus) of pigs and serving chopped with vegetables and sauce such as kung pao sauce or soy sauce with ginger and onions; the meat is relatively flavorless but is a good vehicle for sauce. Other protein sources such as dried shrimp may be added. The texture of the meat has been described as combining crunch with springiness.

Although traditional, the dish is not often served in Singapore.

Cultural impact
Consumption of pig fallopian tubes supposedly has a beneficial effect on a woman's fertility.  It has been categorized by Catherine Ling of CNN as one of the "10 grossest foods in Singapore".

The dish is sometimes imprecisely referred to as pig intestine. One Singapore restaurant was serving it in 2015 as "Famous Pig's Intestines".

References

Singaporean cuisine
Pork dishes